, also known as the , was a Japanese Tendai monk and waka poet of the late-Heian period. He became chief prelate of the Enryaku-ji temple in Kyoto, and one of his poems was included in the Ogura Hyakunin Isshu. Almost fifty of his poems were included in  imperial anthologies, and he produced a private collection of poetry.

Biography 

At age twelve, he entered Mii-dera, eventually becoming , and practiced the Shugendō austerities of the yamabushi for many years and made pilgrimages to various provinces.

Later, in 1123, he rose to become Superior General of Enryaku-ji — the highest prelate of Tendai Buddhism. He also served as Grand Almoner to emperors Shirakawa and Toba.

He was known as the Abbot of Byōdō-in.

He died on 21 March 1135.

Poetry 
Forty-eight of his poems were included in imperial anthologies from the Kin'yō Wakashū on.

The following poem by him was included as No. 66 in Fujiwara no Teika's Ogura Hyakunin Isshu:

His poetry records his experiences on pilgrimage, and was in later ages celebrated as a spiritual precursor to the works of Saigyō.

Other arts 
In addition to his poetry, he was also known as a skilled biwa performer and calligrapher.

In later literature 
As a high-ranking monk of noble birth, he appeared in many later setsuwa tales of the  genre.

References

Bibliography 
McMillan, Peter. 2010 (1st ed. 2008). One Hundred Poets, One Poem Each. New York: Columbia University Press.
Suzuki Hideo, Yamaguchi Shin'ichi, Yoda Yasushi. 2009 (1st ed. 1997). Genshoku: Ogura Hyakunin Isshu. Tokyo: Bun'eidō.

Further reading

External links 
List of Gyōson's poems  in the International Research Center for Japanese Studies's online waka database.
Gyōson on Kotobank.

11th century in Japan
11th-century Japanese poets
12th century in Japan
12th-century Japanese poets
1135 deaths
People of Heian-period Japan
Japanese Buddhist clergy
Tendai
Japanese male poets
Articles containing Japanese poems
Hyakunin Isshu poets
Heian period Buddhist clergy